The desecration of Akbar's tomb occurred in 1691 by dragging out the bones of Akbar, by throwing them angrily into the fire and burnt them after a Jat army attacked the tomb , in Sikandra, Agra, under Rajaram, the third Mughal emperor. This successful raid followed a previous unsuccessful attempt in 1685 and resulted in an escalation of the conflict between the Mughals and the Jats.

Background
According to Aziz Ahmad, the Jats desecrated Akbar's tomb in revenge . Calling this incident ironic, he stated that no person in the subcontinent put more effort than Akbar for establishing harmony between Hindus and Muslims and elevating Hindus to be equal with Muslims. Although many Hindu kingdoms were against the invading mughal army due to destruction of Hindu temples, cities by invading mughal army.

As a vengeance Rajaram's first attempt to despoil Akbar's tomb was in 1685. His Jat force was confronted 10 miles away from Sikandra (a suburb of Agra) by the regional Mughal faujdar Mir Abul Fazl. Fazl foiled their attempt, although he was severely injured in the attack. Both sides had substantial casualties. This resulted in an increase of Fazl's mansab by 200 sawars by Aurangzeb, who also bestowed upon him the title of Iltifat Khan.

Desecration
Rajaram desecrated and plundered Akbar's tomb in 1688. Rajaram used the delay in the arrival of Agra's new faujdar, Shaista Khan in his favour. The naib Muhammad Baqa was in charge in Agra, but he did not confront Rajaram and remained passive during this incident. Rajaram looted gold and silver articles and gems from the tomb. He damaged the mausoleum and destroyed the items he was unable to carry. Niccolao Manucci stated that the Jats also burned the remains of Akbar. The villages that maintained the Taj Mahal were ransacked and set on fire. The Jats captured Mughal officials at Palwal and plundered the Khurja pargana. In response to the inaction of Mughal officials, Aurangzeb reduced the mansab of Khan-i-Jahan and his naib (deputy) by 1000 sawars and 500 respectively.

Aftermath
Architectural historian Catherine Asher stated that the tomb's desecration "was perceived as a blow to Mughal prestige". Alarmed and angered by this incident, Aurangzeb summoned Raja Ram Singh to punish Rajaram and appointed him Mathura's faujdar. Singh was in Kabul, and died before he could undertake his new appointment. Arrangements were also made for setting up thanas in the Mathura area.

References

History of India